Sophia Anne Caruso (born July 11, 2001) is an American actress and singer best known for originating the role of Lydia Deetz in the Broadway musical Beetlejuice, a role for which she won a Theatre World Award. She also portrays Sophie in The School for Good and Evil, in 2022. Other theatre credits include Girl in Lazarus (2015-17) and Iris in The Nether (2015).

Early life 
Caruso was born on July 11, 2001 in Spokane, Washington to Steve Caruso, a former “club pro” golf professional, and Deena Caruso, who owned several clothing and jewelry stores. She is the youngest of three children. Caruso was involved in the local Spokane Children's Theatre, starting at age 7, before transitioning to theatre at Spokane Civic Theatre and Interplayers Professional Theatre. Caruso made her professional debut in 2011 at age nine when she played Helen Keller in the Interplayers Professional Theatre production of The Miracle Worker in Spokane.  

Caruso’s final role in Spokane was as Tina Denmark in Ruthless! The Musical at Interplayers in June 2012. However, it never opened because actor David Gigler collapsed on stage during rehearsal just days before opening and died.

In 2012, she and her family relocated to New York so that Caruso could pursue acting professionally.

Career

Theatre 
In 2014, Caruso was able to reprise her role as Tina Denmark in Ruthless! for a limited run at the Triad Theatre. The next month, she originated the role of Charlotte van Gotheem in Little Dancer at the Kennedy Center in Washington D.C. 

In 2015, Caruso appeared in the off-Broadway play The Nether at the MCC Theater, for which she received a Lucille Lortel nomination for Outstanding Featured Actress in a Play. Later that year, Caruso originated the role of "Girl" in David Bowie's musical Lazarus at New York Theatre Workshop in Manhattan.

She then made her Broadway debut as The Girl in Blackbird at the Belasco Theatre. Later that year, she appeared in the ensemble of the Encores! staged concert production of Runaways at New York City Center. In October 2016, she reprised her role as "Girl" in London in the King's Cross Theatre production of Lazarus for which she received a WhatsOnStage Award nomination for "Best Supporting Actress in a Musical".

In 2017, Caruso originated the role of Lydia Deetz in a workshop of the musical Beetlejuice, reprising the role in the musical's tryout at the National Theatre in Washington D.C. before starring in the Broadway production beginning in March 2019. She won a Theatre World Award for the role. Caruso left the show abruptly on February 19, 2020, using her contractual out in order to pursue work in film and television.

Music 
Caruso's debut single "Toys" was released on May 22, 2020. The song was produced by Henry Hey, who worked with Caruso as the musical director of Lazarus, and Nick Littlemore of Empire of the Sun. She plans to release an EP. In July 2022, Caruso released another single, "Snow & Ice".

Film 
Caruso was cast to star alongside Sofia Wylie as Sophie in the Netflix fantasy film The School for Good and Evil, an adaptation of the book series by Soman Chainani.

Acting credits

Theatre

Film

Television

Discography
Singles
 "Toys" (2020)
 "Goodbye" (2021)
 "Snow & Ice" (2022)
 “Thing Like That” (2022)

Theatre albums
 Lazarus Original Cast Recording (2016)
 Beetlejuice Original Broadway Cast Recording (2019)
 The Liz Swados Project (2020)

Awards and nominations

References

External links

2001 births
Living people
Actresses from Spokane, Washington
American child actresses
American child singers
American stage actresses
Theatre World Award winners
21st-century American women